The 1st Destroyer Squadron was an administrative unit of the Royal Navy from 1951 to 1970.

Operational history
Originally established as the 1st Destroyer Flotilla in 1947 it was renamed in 1st Destroyer Squadron in October 1951. During its existence, the squadron included C-class and Battle-class destroyers and Leander-class frigates. Ships from the squadron saw service in the Mediterranean Fleet, the Far East Fleet, in the Beira Patrol and as part of the Standing Naval Force Atlantic (STANAVFORLANT). 

Of note: Command structure organizational changes took place within Royal Navy post war period the term Flotilla was previously applied to a tactical unit until 1951 which led to the creation of three specific Flag Officers, Flotillas responsible for the Eastern, Home and Mediterranean fleets the existing destroyer flotillas were re-organized now as administrative squadrons.

Squadron commander

References

See also
 List of squadrons and flotillas of the Royal Navy

Destroyer squadrons of the Royal Navy